Kheyaru (also Romanized as Kheyārū, Khīārū, Khiyaroo, and Khīyārū) is a village in Chah-e Mobarak Rural District, Chah-e Mobarak District, Asaluyeh County, Bushehr Province, Iran. At the 2006 census, its population was 520, in 77 families.

References 

Populated places in Asaluyeh County